Roy Garvin Sanders, nicknamed "Butch", (August 1, 1892 – January 17, 1950) was a Major League Baseball pitcher. In 1917, Sanders was purchased from the Kansas City Blues of the American Association by the Cincinnati Reds and would play with the team that season. Later that year, Sanders returned to Kansas City when the Blues purchased him from the Reds. Not long after, Sanders was traded to the Pittsburgh Pirates to complete a deal that included Fritz Mollwitz.

He played at the collegiate level at William Jewell College.

References

People from Stafford, Kansas
Cincinnati Reds players
Pittsburgh Pirates players
Major League Baseball pitchers
Kansas City Blues (baseball) players
William Jewell Cardinals baseball players
1892 births
1950 deaths
Baseball players from Kansas